Bohio may refer to:

 The Bohio Formation, a geologic formation in Panama
 , an armed brig in commission in the United States Navy from 1861 to 1865 that saw service in the American Civil War
 Bohio, perceived native name on Cuba for Hispaniola at the time of Columbus' first visit in the Santa María (ship)